Nina Simone and Piano! is an album by American jazz singer, songwriter, and pianist Nina Simone, with Simone accompanying herself on piano.

Track listing

Personnel
Nina Simone - vocals, piano, arrangements
Technical
Ray Hall - engineer
Joseph Dylewski - photography

References 

1969 albums
Nina Simone albums
Albums arranged by Nina Simone
RCA Victor albums